Saraswatipur is a residential locality that is part of Dharwad city of Karnataka state, India. Saraswatpur is located on top of a hillock besotted with old bungalows and garden in front of them. Saraswatpur is near to Malmaddi, another locality of Dharwad. The name is derived because of concentration of Saraswat Brahmins in the area. Saraswatpur has been developed to an urban locality in the recent years. Being very close to some educational institutions like SDM College of Engineering and Technology helped the rapid development of this place. Also it is very near to the century-old Dharwad Railway station. Famous personalities like Girish Karnad and Leena Chandavarkar hail from this area. One of the Unit office of National Projects Construction Corporation Limited, ( KREIS North Unit ) had been here.

External links
Saraswatpur 
Dharwad 

Cities and towns in Dharwad district
Neighborhoods in Dharwad